Kellman is a surname. Notable people with the surname include:

 Anthony Kellman (born 1955), Barbados-born poet, novelist, and musician
 Barnet Kellman, television and film director, television producer and film actor
 David Kellman, a triplet profiled in the 2018 documentary film, Three Identical Strangers
 Edith Kellman (1911–2007), noted American astronomer, worked on the Yerkes system of stellar classification
 Frank A. Kellman, politician in the State of Wisconsin
 Joel Kellman (born 1994), Swedish ice hockey player
 Joseph Kellman (1920–2010), American businessman and philanthropist
 León Kellman (1924–1981), Panamanian professional baseball player and manager
 Moshe Kelman member of the Palmach
 Norris J. Kellman, politician in the State of Wisconsin
 Peter Kellman (born 1945), anti-war activist, author, and American labor union leader
 Philip Kellman, Distinguished Professor of Psychology at University of California, Los Angeles
 Richard Kellman or Ricky Kelman, (born 1950), former child actor and young adult actor
 Steven G. Kellman (born 1947), American critic, academic and author

See also 
 Kellerman
 Kellermann
 Kelman
 Kjellman (disambiguation)

References